Frank Barnard may refer to:

 Francis Jones Barnard (1829–1889), Canadian businessman and Member of Parliament
 Francis Stillman Barnard (1856–1936), Canadian parliamentarian and Lieutenant Governor of British Columbia
 Frank Barnard (author) (born 1938), British novelist and journalist